The scaly-throated foliage-gleaner (Anabacerthia variegaticeps), also known as the spectacled foliage-gleaner, is a species of bird in the family Furnariidae.
It is found in Belize, Colombia, Costa Rica, Ecuador, El Salvador, Guatemala, Honduras, Mexico, and Panama.
Its natural habitats are subtropical or tropical moist lowland forest and subtropical or tropical moist montane forest.

References

scaly-throated foliage-gleaner
Birds of Central America
Birds of the Colombian Andes
Birds of the Ecuadorian Andes
scaly-throated foliage-gleaner
Taxonomy articles created by Polbot
Taxa named by Philip Sclater